There are at least 59 named mountains in Granite County, Montana.
 Anaconda Hill, el. 
 Anderson Hill, el. 
 Babcock Mountain, el. 
 Burnt Mountain, el. 
 Cable Mountain, el. 
 Cinnabar Point, el. 
 Cinnamon Bear Point, el. 
 Congdon Peak, el. 
 Cutaway Mountain, el. 
 Douglas Mountain, el. 
 Duffy Hill, el. 
 Eagle Point, el. 
 East Hill, el. 
 Emerine Mount, el. 
 Fisher Point, Granite County, el. 
 Fox Peak, Granite County, el. 
 Franklin Hill, el. 
 Goat Mountain, el. 
 Golden Mountain, el. 
 Green Mountain, Granite County, el. 
 Harvey Point, Granite County, el. 
 Henderson Mountain, el. 
 Hickey Hill, el. 
 Hogback Point, el. 
 Hope Hill, el. 
 King Mountain, el. 
 Kurt Peak, el. 
 Medicine Tree Hill, el. 
 Moose Mountain, el. 
 Mount Baldy, el. 
 Mount Princeton, Granite County, el. 
 Mount Tiny, el. 
 Nineteen ten Ridge, el. 
 Nirling Hill, el. 
 Pierre Hill, el. 
 Quigg Peak, el. 
 Racetrack Peak, el. 
 Rainbow Mountain, el. 
 Ram Mountain, el. 
 Red Hill, el. 
 Red Lion Mountain, el. 
 Rose Mountain, el. 
 Rumsey Mountain, el. 
 Senate Mountain, el. 
 Silver King Mountain, el. 
 Sliderock Mountain, el. 
 Solomon Mountain, el. 
 Spink Point, el. 
 Strawberry Mountain, Granite County, el. 
 Sugarloaf, Granite County, el. 
 Sunrise Mountain, el. 
 Table Mountain, Granite County, el. 
 The Eyebrow, el. 
 Twin Peaks, Granite County, el. 
 Tyler Point, el. 
 Union Peak, Granite County, el. 
 Warren Peak, Granite County, el. 
 Welcome Hill, el. 
 West Fork Buttes, el.

See also
 List of mountains in Montana
 List of mountain ranges in Montana

Notes

Granite